The Golden Triangle (sometimes called the Footballer Belt) is an area of affluent small towns and villages in Cheshire, England. The exact three points of the triangle are the subject of local debate but are generally considered to be Alderley Edge, Prestbury, and Wilmslow. The area, about 5 miles across, is noted for expensive houses in a pleasant countryside setting that is popular with wealthy Premier League footballers, entertainment industry figures, and businesspeople. Five of the ten most expensive roads in North West England have been identified as being in this area. Withinlee Road in Prestbury is also said to be the most expensive street in northern England, with prices averaging around £1.2 million .

The triangle is part of the parliamentary constituencies of Macclesfield and Tatton. The area and its rich businessmen were fictionalised in the drama series Goldplated. Much of the action in Howard Jacobson's novel Shylock Is My Name also takes place within the Golden Triangle. It is also the main basis for the reality TV show The Real Housewives of Cheshire.

Notable residents

Current and former residents include:
 Alan Garner
John Junior
 David Beckham
 Kevin De Bruyne
 Marcus Rashford
 Cristiano Ronaldo
 Wayne Rooney and Coleen Rooney
 Raheem Sterling
Jordan Henderson
Virgil van Dijk
Trent Alexander-Arnold
 Kyle Walker

Tanya Bardsley and Phil Bardsley
 Alan Turing

References

Geography of Cheshire
Social class in the United Kingdom